Carl Víctor Herrera Allen (born December 14, 1966) is a retired Trinidadian-born Venezuelan basketball player. A power forward, he was part of the Houston Rockets National Basketball Association championship teams of the mid-1990s. He was the first Venezuelan to ever play in the NBA.

Basketball career
Out of Jacksonville Junior College in Texas and the University of Houston, Herrera was selected by the Miami Heat with the 30th pick in the 1990 NBA Draft, spending his first professional season in Spain, with Real Madrid. Partnering with another future NBA player, Stanley Roberts, he helped the Liga ACB club to the Korać Cup final in his only season.

Herrera began his professional career in the United States in 1991 with the Houston Rockets, where he played until 1995, when the Rockets swept the Orlando Magic in four games to win their second straight NBA Championship. During the regular season of the two successful seasons combined, he averaged six points and four rebounds in roughly 20 minutes of play.

Afterwards, Herrera spent three seasons with the San Antonio Spurs, before splitting the final year of his NBA career, the lockout-shortened 1999 season, with the Vancouver Grizzlies and the Denver Nuggets.

After wrapping up his NBA career, he rejoined the Venezuelan basketball league, where he began playing at the age of 16. Herrera was also a long-time member of the Venezuela national team.

Herrera later became a coach with Gatos de Monagas.

References

External links
NBA.com profile
Clutch Fans Houston Rockets profile
Stats at BasketballReference

1966 births
Living people
2002 FIBA World Championship players
Basketball players at the 1992 Summer Olympics
Cocodrilos de Caracas players
Denver Nuggets players
Guaiqueríes de Margarita players
Guaros de Lara (basketball) players
Houston Cougars men's basketball players
Houston Rockets players
Junior college men's basketball players in the United States
Liga ACB players
Miami Heat draft picks
National Basketball Association players from Trinidad and Tobago
National Basketball Association players from Venezuela
Olympic basketball players of Venezuela
Panteras de Miranda players
Power forwards (basketball)
Real Madrid Baloncesto players
San Antonio Spurs players
Trinidad and Tobago emigrants to Venezuela
Trotamundos B.B.C. players
Vancouver Grizzlies players
Venezuelan expatriate basketball people in Spain
Venezuelan expatriate basketball people in the United States
Venezuelan expatriate basketball people in Canada
Venezuelan people of Trinidad and Tobago descent
Venezuelan men's basketball players
1990 FIBA World Championship players